Jalagam (Telugu: జలగం) is one of the Indian surnames.
  Jalagam Kondala Rao, former Parliament member from Khammam (Lok Sabha constituency)
 Jalagam Prasada Rao, former Indian politician
 Jalagam Vengala Rao, former Chief Minister of Andhra Pradesh
 Jalagam Venkat Rao, former member of the Andhra Pradesh legislative assembly.

Surnames of Indian origin